Kingsley Chibueze Onyeukwu  (born 17 July 1991) is a Nigerian football midfielder who plays for Benfica e Castelo Branco. He played on the Portuguese second tier for Beira-Mar.

References

1991 births
Living people
Nigerian footballers
S.C. Freamunde players
AD Oliveirense players
S.C. Beira-Mar players
Amarante F.C. players
Anadia F.C. players
F.C. Oliveira do Hospital players
Sport Benfica e Castelo Branco players
Association football midfielders
Liga Portugal 2 players
Nigerian expatriate footballers
Expatriate footballers in Portugal
Nigerian expatriate sportspeople in Portugal
People from Owerri
Sportspeople from Imo State